A Language for Life, better known as the Bullock Report, was a UK government report published in 1975 by an independent committee, chaired by Alan Bullock, set up by the government to consider the teaching of language.

Its primary recommendation was that "every secondary school should develop a policy for language across the curriculum".

The Bullock report also called for a re-examination of the debate into what English was, how it should be taught and what needs to be covered.  This went on to produce the Cox Report 1989 and the National Curriculum for English followed.

The Bullock Report had a major influence on the thinking of English teachers in the second half of the 1970s and early 1980s; but it was moved to the background by less optimistic and humanistic influences, and the greater emphasis on employability of the Thatcher years.  It still makes powerful reading.

Terms of Reference 
The committee of inquiry was set-up in 1972 by Margaret Thatcher, the then Secretary of State for Education in Ted Heath's Conservative government following the earlier publication of a report by the National Foundation for Educational Research (NFER) entitled 'The Trend of Reading Standards'.  Alan Bullock was appointed the chairman and the committee was given the following brief:-'To consider in relation to schools:
 all aspects of teaching the use of English, including reading, writing, and speech;
 how present practice might be improved and the role that initial and in-service training might play;
 to what extent arrangements for monitoring the general level of attainment in these skills can be introduced or improved;
and to make recommendations.'

References

The Bullock Report: The Coming of the Age of Democracy, by W. B. Creighton  1977 Cardiff University. 
 Teaching for literacy : reflections on the Bullock report, by F. R. Davis, & R.P. Parker 1978  Ward Lock Pubs.
 

Education in the United Kingdom
1975 in the United Kingdom
Reports of the United Kingdom government
1975 documents